The City of Melton is a local government area in Victoria, Australia, on Melbourne's western rural–urban fringe.

It is governed by the Melton City Council.  The seat of local government and administrative offices are located at Council headquarters in Melton, the settlement after which the city takes its name which lies at the western end of the LGA and is currently its largest urban area with a population of over 54,000.

City of Melton has a rapid population growth rate, ranked 3rd fastest among LGAs in Victoria in 2010.  It was granted city status in 2012.

History

Melton was first incorporated as a district on 16 September 1862, and became a shire on 24 May 1871. Parts of the north and south ridings of the Shire of Braybrook (later City of Sunshine) were annexed to Melton as the Rockbank Riding on 24 May 1916, and this was added to in 1951. Other minor boundary adjustments with Bulla and Keilor occurred in May 1959.

In 1994, following large-scale statewide local government reform, Melton acquired the Exford district from the City of Werribee, growing to its present size.

After several years of community consultation to defer applying for city status until it had reached 150,000, the council nevertheless reversed the decision and city status was granted in September, 2012. The first elected Mayor under the 'City" status was Kathy Majdlik.

In the 2020 Local Government elections, Melton had its first Aboriginal Councillor elected, Cr Ashleigh Vandenberg. A proud Wiradjuri woman making history and becoming the first Aboriginal Councillor in Melbourne's Western Suburbs.

Art and culture 
Bush ballad "Click Go the Shears" was first published in 1891 in a local newspaper by "C.C. of Eynesbury". Eynesbury was is a homestead and grazing property owned by Samuel Staughton.

CS Gallery is a contemporary exhibition space located at Caroline Springs Library and Learning Hub. It provides opportunities for artists and groups to exhibit and does not charge fees or commission. Melton Library and Learning Hub provides a number of hanging walls for the presentation of visual art and community exhibitions.

Administration

Council

The City's area is divided into three wards, two of which elects three Councillors, the other one electing two Councillors. The Councillors elect a mayor from among the council's members.

The current council, as of October 2020 is:

Townships and localities
The 2021 census, the city had a population of 178,960 up from 135,443 in the 2016 census

^ - Territory divided with another LGA
* - Not noted in 2016 Census
# - Not noted in 2021 Census

Population

Residential estates 
Recent large housing projects include: 
 Atherstone, within the new suburbs of Cobblebank and Strathtulloh. ($1.2 billion).
 Eynesbury Township.
 Waterford Estate, in the suburb of Weir Views. 
 Woodlea, within the new suburb of Aintree.

See also
 List of places on the Victorian Heritage Register in the City of Melton

References

External links
 
Melton City Council home page
Map of Mid & South West Mental Health Area from Department of Human Services, Victoria, Australia
Public Transport Victoria local public transport map
Link to Land Victoria interactive maps

Local government areas of Melbourne
Greater Melbourne (region)